Brake is a surname of English origin and may refer to:

 Brian Brake (1927–1988), New Zealand photographer
 Colin Brake (born 1963), English television writer and script editor
 John Brake (New Zealand rugby player) (born 1952), New Zealand rugby union player and coach
 John Brake (born 1988), English rugby union player
 Patricia Brake (1942–2022), English television actress
 Richard Brake, Welsh/American actor
 Tom Brake (born 1962), British politician

See also
 Brake (disambiguation)